Cham Sorkh (also known as Jam Sorkh) is a village in Sahneh Rural District, in the Central District of Sahneh County, Kermanshah Province, Iran. At the 2006 census, its population was 111, in 25 families.

References 

Populated places in Sahneh County